The 1981 Egyptian Open was a men's tennis tournament played on outdoor clay courts that was part of the 1981 Volvo Grand Prix circuit. It was the fifth edition of the tournament and was played in Cairo,  Egypt from 9 March until 15 March 1981. First-seeded Guillermo Vilas won the singles title.

Finals

Singles
 Guillermo Vilas defeated  Peter Elter 6–2, 6–3
 It was Vilas's 2nd singles title of the year and the 51st of his career.

Doubles
 Ismail El Shafei /  Balázs Taróczy defeated  Paolo Bertolucci /  Gianni Ocleppo 6–7, 6–3, 6–1

References

External links
 ITF tournament edition details

Cairo Open
Cairo Open
1981 in Egypt